Morne aux Diables, also known as Devil's Peak, is a volcano on the island of Dominica and the volcanic formation is the northernmost peak on the island. The volcano is considered dormant, with no unusual volcanic activity reported aside from a swarm of small earthquakes detected in 2009–2010. Sulfur springs are present near the volcano.

See also 
 List of mountains of Dominica
 List of volcanoes in Dominica

References 

Mountains of Dominica
Volcanoes of Dominica
Mountains of the Caribbean
Inactive volcanoes